Mārtiņš Kazāks is a Latvian economist and the current governor of the central Bank of Latvia since December 2019. Kazāks was the chief economist of the Latvian branch of Hansabanka (now Swedbank) from 2005 to 2018. From 2018 to 2019, he was a member of the Council of the Bank of Latvia.

Biography 
Mārtiņš Kazāks was born on September 19, 1973 in Liepāja. He finished his secondary education at Liepāja Rainis 6th Secondary School. In 1995, he graduated from the University of Latvia with a bachelor's degree in economics. 

In 1996, he received a degree in economics from the University of Cambridge. He received his master's degree in economics from the Queen Mary University of London in 1997, and a doctorate in economics in 2005.

References

External links 
Martins Kazaks Bloomberg profile

Governors of the Bank of Latvia
Latvian economists
1973 births
People from Liepāja
University of Latvia alumni
Alumni of the University of Cambridge
Alumni of Queen Mary University of London
Living people